Pančić's Peak is the highest point in the Kopaonik mountain range, which straddles southern Serbia and northern Kosovo. The peak is 2,017 m high, located in the Brus municipality in Serbia. The Serbia–Kosovo demarcation line lies some 50 m south of the summit. Pančić's Peak is part of the Suvo Rudište mountainous plateau and natural zone of the Kopaonik National Park. The Kopaonik tourist center operates cable cars to Pančić's Peak and Suvo Rudište Peak.

History
The mountain peak was previously named Milan's Peak (Milanov vrh) after the first king of modern Serbia, Milan Obrenović. On 7 July 1951 it was renamed after the Serbian botanist Josif Pančić, whose remains were buried at the top in a small mausoleum, located next to the radio tower. A memorial to Pančić was placed at the top already in 1897. The site was damaged during the 1999 NATO bombing of Yugoslavia. The Serbian portion of the Kopaonik (including Pančić's Peak) are part of the Kopaonik National Park, and the only road access to the peak is via the park. The peak can be easily reached from the Konaci tourist complex by foot.

See also
List of mountains in Serbia

Annotations

References

Sources

External links

Kopaonik
Kosovo–Serbia border
Mausoleums in Serbia
Two-thousanders of Serbia